Jikmir is a Payam within Nasir County, Upper Nile State, South Sudan. The main town in Jikmir Payam is Jikmir, with a population of approximately 10,000 to 20,000. The town is located 15 miles west of the Ethiopian border, Gambella Region. Jikmir Payam expands from the town of Kierwan to most western to the Ethiopian town of Burebiey across the Sobat river. The ethnicity of people in Jikmir is a predominantly Nuer ethnic group who speak Nuer or Thoknath.

Sports 

Jikmir Football Club(JFC) also called Jikmir Joklech is one of football club in Nasir county. Jikmir Joklec won 2021 and 2022 County cup where they represented Nasir county in State tournament.

History 

During the Sudan Civil War from 1983 to 2005, Jikmir served as the primary military town for SPLA soldiers as they battled the Khartoum government in Nasir. From 1983 to 1989, Jikmir hosted key senior officers such as CDR William Nyuon Bany, CDR Koang Chuol Kulang, and CDR Steven Duol Chuol Lual until the fall of Nasir town in 1989.

During South Sudan Civil War of 2013–Present, Jikmir serves as major city for internally displaced persons(IDPs) around Nasir county

Notable people from Jikmir 

Prominent leaders from Jikmir include Hon. Puot Kang Chuol (National Minister of Petroleum, South Sudan), Gen. Koang Chuol Ranley(SSPDF Doctrine and Training Chief), Hon. Pal Ruach Duop (Deputy Speaker of Upper Nile State Transitional Legislative Assembly),  Ato. Bagual Jock (Gambella Town Mayor, Ethiopian); Hon. Mark Chuol Wie (Ethiopia, Politician, late), Hon. Wupal Lual Yier (Ethiopia Politician, late), Gen. Stephen Duol Chuol Lual(SPLA, Late), Gen. Dep Tew Wahr(Upper Nile Police Chief, late). Gen. Pur Nienkel (SPLA, Late),

Governmental structure 

The primary governmental body in Jikmir includes Payam leadership, traditional Chiefs, and the town Police Chief. The major institutions in Jikmir are Stephen Duol Primary School, Jikmir Presbyterian Church, and Jikmir Payam Compound.

References

Sources
Bol Jock, B. (2022). Jikmir, South Sudan in the late 1970s. Facebook. Retrieved February 5, 2023, from Jikmir ,South sudan in the late 1970s vs Jikmir 2022 , Edited by Bol Jok (Nuer History,). For more information please subscribe to my YouTube channel... | By Kim Koang Biel | Facebook 
Bol Jock, B. J. (Ed.). (2022, May 14). Jikmir, South Sudan in the late 1970s vs Jikmir 2022 edited by Bol Jock. YouTube. Retrieved February 5, 2023, from Jikmir, South Sudan in the late 1970s vs Jikmir 2022 edited by Bol Jock 
 IRNA Report. (2017, January 2). IRNA report: Jikmir, Nasir County (28-29 January 2017). HumanitarianResponse. Retrieved February 5, 2023, from IRNA Report: Jikmir, Nasir County (28-29 January 2017) | HumanitarianResponse 
 Komach Deng, K. K. (Ed.). (2015, December 17). Nasir native in Jikmir. YouTube. Retrieved February 5, 2023, from Nasir Native in Jikmir Video 
 Reliefweb. (2017, March 9). South Sudan: NFI and emergency shelter assessment/verification report, Jikmir - WVI, SSUDA, Ada, SSRC15 (February 2017) - south Sudan. ReliefWeb. Retrieved February 5, 2023, from South Sudan: NFI and Emergency Shelter Assessment/Verification Report, Jikmir - WVI, SSUDA, ADA, SSRC15 (February 2017) - South Sudan | ReliefWeb

External links 
 Jikmir, South Sudan in the late 1970s vs Jikmir 2022 edited by Bol Jock
 Nasir Native in Jikmir Video
 Jikmir Nasir South Sudan
 Jikmir Nasir South Sudan
https://www.humanitarianresponse.info/en/operations/south-sudan/assessment/irna-report-jikmir-nasir-county-28-29-january-2017

Populated places in Upper Nile (state)